Bassel Al-Shaar is a Syrian former footballer who played as a defender.

References

External links

1982 births
Living people
Syrian footballers
Syrian expatriate footballers
Expatriate footballers in Jordan
Expatriate footballers in Lebanon
Expatriate footballers in Oman
Syria international footballers
Syrian expatriate sportspeople in Jordan
Syrian expatriate sportspeople in Lebanon
Syrian expatriate sportspeople in Oman
Sportspeople from Damascus
Al Ahed FC players
Association football defenders
Lebanese Premier League players
Syrian Premier League players